Stephanomeria runcinata is a species of flowering plant in the family Asteraceae known by the common name desert wirelettuce.

References

runcinata